The 2016–17 season was the 128th season of competitive football by Celtic. They competed in the Scottish Premiership, Champions League, League Cup and Scottish Cup.  They won all three domestic tournaments, completing a domestic treble (the 11th in Scottish football), while going undefeated in 47 domestic games and were nicknamed the "Invincibles".

Season overview

May
On 20 May 2016, Brendan Rodgers was appointed as the club's new manager, succeeding Ronny Deila in the role.

June
On 23 June 2016, Celtic made £1.1 million from the £11 million sale of Victor Wanyama from Southampton to Tottenham Hotspur as the club had inserted a ten percent sell on clause in his contract when he was sold to Southampton in July 2013.

September
On 10 September 2016, Moussa Dembélé became the first Celtic player to score a hat-trick in an Old Firm match since 1973 (the last was Harry Hood in the Scottish League Cup), in a 5–1 home victory against Rangers. It was also the first hat-trick scored in a league match against Rangers since Stevie Chalmers in 1966.

On 24 September 2016, Scott Sinclair scored in the first six successive opening league matches of the season, breaking Jimmy McGrory's previous club record of five.

November
On 27 November 2016, Celtic won the Scottish League Cup, after beating Aberdeen 3–0 in the Final at Hampden Park, with goals from Tom Rogic, James Forrest, and a Moussa Dembélé penalty. It was a milestone for the club: the 100th major trophy in its history (one European Cup, 47 Scottish League championships, 36 Scottish Cups, and 16 League Cups).

December
On 13 December 2016, Brendan Rodgers broke the record for the best unbeaten start to a domestic season as a Celtic manager in their first season in his 19th match in charge, with a 1–0 win at home to Hamilton Academical in the Scottish Premiership. The record had been set by Martin O'Neill after his first 18 games in charge (in 2000–01).

On 28 December 2016, Celtic won 2–0 at home to Ross County in the Premiership, a result which meant the club had gone throughout the entire year of 2016 without a single domestic defeat at Celtic Park.

On 31 December 2016, Celtic inflicted a first home defeat on Old Firm rivals Rangers at Ibrox Stadium in all competitions since September 2015, with a 2–1 win in the Premiership.

January
On 29 January 2017, Celtic won 4–0 at home to Heart of Midlothian in the Premiership, with the team breaking a 50-years-old club record for the longest unbeaten start to a domestic season (26 matches in-a-row in 1966–67 by the Lisbon Lions), with this victory at Celtic Park being their 27th domestic match unbeaten.

February
On 2 February 2017, it was announced that Celtic would be awarded £386,543 (of a £1.75 million shared by Scottish clubs) by UEFA to cover costs for releasing the club's players who were called up by their country for international duty during the UEFA Euro 2016 Finals tournament and the UEFA Euro 2016 qualifying campaign.

March
On 12 March 2017, Celtic drew 1–1 at home with Rangers in the Premiership, a result that ended a run of 22 consecutive league victories. It is record only bettered by Martin O'Neill's team who managed 25 league wins in a row in 2003–04.

April

On 2 April 2017, Celtic won 5–0 away to Hearts in the Premiership, to win the earliest Scottish league championship in 88 years with eight league matches still remaining (Rangers did so in 1928–29 with the same number of outstanding fixtures).

In the 2016–17 Scottish Cup semi-final, Celtic eliminated Rangers in an Old Firm encounter, the first time they had beaten their Glasgow rivals at this stage of the competition since 1925, at the seventh attempt.

On 29 April 2017, Celtic won 5–1 away to Rangers in the Premiership to record the club's biggest scoreline for a victory at Ibrox since a 4–0 win 1897.

May
On 7 May 2017, PFA Scotland named Scott Sinclair as the Player of the Year, Kieran Tierney as the Young Player of the Year, Brendan Rodgers as the Manager of the Year. Moussa Dembélé was also named as the winner of Goal of the Season, as well as Sinclair, Tierney, Dembélé, Mikael Lustig, Stuart Armstrong and Scott Brown were named in the Premiership Team of the Year.

On 19 May 2017, Scott Brown was named as the Scottish Premiership Player of the Season and Brendan Rodgers was named as the Scottish Premiership Manager of the Season.

On 21 May 2017, Scottish Football Writers' Association named Scott Sinclair as the Footballer of the Year, Kieran Tierney as the Young Player of the Year and Brendan Rodgers as the Manager of the Year.

On 21 May 2017, Celtic won 2–0 at home to Hearts in the league, a result which meant Celtic had completed a full 38 match season without losing, becoming the first team to go an entire Scottish top flight season without a defeat since Rangers in 1898–99 (when only 18 league matches were played). The team also bettered the club's best points total (103) and most wins (33) from 2001–02, fewest defeats (1) from 2001–02 and 2013–14, most goals scored (105) from 2003–04, and title winning points margin (29) from 2013–14 for a SPL / SPFL Premiership season (since 1998–99), finishing the season with 106 points, 34 wins, no defeats, 106 goals scored, and a title winning points margin of 30 points.

On 21 May 2017, Celtic's title winning points margin of 30 points was also the second largest points gap ever between first and second place in top flight leagues across Europe (only bettered by PSG who won Ligue 1 by 31 points in 2015–16). Celtic's total of 106 points accumulated in the league is a European record for top flight league (Barry Town of Wales in 1996–97 reached 105 points).

On 27 May 2017, Celtic won 2–1 against Aberdeen in the Scottish Cup final at Hampden Park, with the Celtic goals coming from Stuart Armstrong and Tom Rogic. The result meant that the team completed the domestic treble for the fourth time in the club's history and finished a 47 match domestic season without losing a match.

Results and fixtures

Pre-season and friendlies
Celtic preceded the 2016–17 campaign with a pre-season tour of Slovenia, with matches against Celje, Olimpija Ljubljana and Maribor. The Hoops also made a short trip over the Slovenia–Austria border to face Sturm Graz, in preparation for the UEFA Champions League qualifiers. Brendan Rodgers' side also faced Wolfsburg, Leicester City, Barcelona and Inter Milan in a busy pre-season schedule. Celtic's first warm-up match ended in a 2–2 draw with Celje; Nadir Çiftçi and Tom Rogic scored as Celtic came from behind to avoid defeat. Rodgers recorded his first victory as manager in a 1–0 win over Strum Graz, with Ryan Christie on the scoresheet. Celtic achieved another positive result only days later, this time against Olimpija Ljubljana, with Leigh Griffiths striking twice. A scoreless draw with Maribor rounded off Celtic's preparations before the competitive action began. Celtic's remaining pre-season matches were interspersed with European football. The Bhoys recorded an impressive 2–1 victory over Bundesliga side Wolfsburg in Brendan Rodgers' first match at Celtic Park. This was followed by a draw with Leicester City in Glasgow, and defeats to Barcelona in Dublin and Inter Milan in Limerick.

International Champions Cup

Scottish Premiership

UEFA Champions League

Second qualifying round
Celtic faced Lincoln Red Imps (Gibraltar) in the Second Qualifying Round of the UEFA Champions League. The first leg saw the part-time underdogs record a shock 1–0 victory, thanks to Lee Casciaro's second half finish. However, Celtic turned the tie around in the second leg, winning 3–0 on the night, with goals from Mikael Lustig, Leigh Griffiths and Patrick Roberts.

Third qualifying round
Celtic faced Astana (Kazakhstan) in the Third Qualifying Round of the UEFA Champions League. The first leg saw a Yuriy Logvinenko header cancelled out by a late goal from Leigh Griffiths, resulting in a 1–1 draw. A week later, the Scottish champions progressed to the Play-Off Round, following a 2–1 win in the second leg. Moussa Dembélé's last-minute penalty secured Celtic's place in Europe until the end of the year.

Play-Off Round

Group stage

Scottish League Cup

Scottish Cup

Player statistics

Squad, appearances and goals

Goalscorers

Last updated: 27 May 2017

Disciplinary record
Includes all competitive matches. Players listed below made at least one appearance for Celtic first squad during the season.

Scott Brown's red card against Ross County on 16 April 2017 was subsequently downgraded to a yellow card.

Hat-tricks

(H) – Home; (A) – Away; (N) – Neutral

Clean sheets
As of 27 May 2017.

Team statistics

League table

Competition Overview

League results summary

Source:

Results by round

Technical staff

Transfers

In

Out

Total income:  £3 million

Total expenditure:  £7.6 million

Total profit/loss:  £4.6 million

See also
 List of Celtic F.C. seasons
List of unbeaten football club seasons
Nine in a row

References

Celtic F.C. seasons
Celtic
Celtic
Scottish football championship-winning seasons